Otto Carl Albrecht Köcher (1884 – 27 December 1945) was a lawyer and the Ambassador of Nazi Germany to Switzerland from 1937 until 1945 as well as Liechtenstein.  He left the post on 30 April 1945 and was arrested on 31 July 1945 by American forces. Held at a prison camp in Ludwigsburg, he committed suicide on 27 December 1945.

References

Ambassadors of Germany to Switzerland
Nazis who committed suicide in prison custody
1945 suicides
1884 births
1945 deaths
Nazis who committed suicide in Germany